Arnes may refer to:

 ARNES, Academic and Research Network of Slovenia
 Arnes, Manitoba, Canada
 Arnes Airport, located northeast of Arnes, Manitoba, Canada
 Arnes, Terra Alta, a town in Catalonia, Spain
 Årnes, the administrative centre of Nes municipality, Akershus, Norway
 Årnes Station, a railway station located in Årnes

See also
 Aarnes, a surname
 Arnas (disambiguation)